Procollagen C-endopeptidase (procollagen C-terminal proteinase, carboxyprocollagen peptidase, procollagen C-terminal peptidase, procollagen C-proteinase, procollagen carboxypeptidase, procollagen carboxy-terminal proteinase, procollagen peptidase) is an enzyme. This enzyme catalyses the following chemical reaction

 Cleavage of the C-terminal propeptide at Ala-Asp in type I and II procollagens and at Arg-Asp in type III

This endopeptidase belongs to the peptidase family M12 (astacin family).

References

External links 
 

EC 3.4.24